Grooverville is an unincorporated community in Brooks County, Georgia, United States. It was once known as Key and was located at the crossing of the Thomasville and Madison and Sharpe's Store Road, which was in Thomas County prior to the creation of Brooks County from Lowndes and Thomas counties in 1858.

Grooverville was incorporated on December 8, 1859. The charter of Grooverville was terminated by an act of the Georgia Legislature effective July 1, 1995. Since then, Grooverville has been granted status as Grooverville Historic Township by State of Georgia, Department of Community Affairs.

Grooverville Methodist Church and Liberty Baptist Church, the later listed on the National Register of Historic Places in 2013, are located in the area.

Geography
Grooverville is located at  (30.729141, -83.715055).

It is a circular area  radius from the crossing of Liberty Church Road and Grooverville Road: .

References

Unincorporated communities in Brooks County, Georgia
Former municipalities in Georgia (U.S. state)
Unincorporated communities in Georgia (U.S. state)
Populated places disestablished in 1995
Unincorporated communities in Valdosta metropolitan area